Iglesia La Luz del Mundo is a historic church located in Salt Lake City, Utah, United States. Originally built as the First Church of Christ, Scientist, on July 30, 1976 it was added to the National Register of Historic Places.

History
First Church of Christ, Scientist, was organized on July 17, 1891, and was the first Christian Science church in Utah. The church building, designed by local architect, Walter E. Ware, in the Richardsonian Romanesque style, was built in 1898 of brick and Utah Kyune sandstone. After being completely paid for, it was dedicated on November 27, 1898.

Current use
The Christian Science Church left the building in 2002. After being used for a time by Anthony's Fine Art and Antiques, the building is once again being used as a church. Iglesia La Luz del Mundo has used the building since about 2006.

See also

 National Register of Historic Places listings in Salt Lake City
 List of former Christian Science churches, societies and buildings
 First Church of Christ, Scientist (disambiguation)

References

External links

 Waymarking listing
 Christian Science in Utah
 State Historical Marker on property

Churches on the National Register of Historic Places in Utah
Former Christian Science churches, societies and buildings in the United States
Churches in Salt Lake City
Churches in Utah
Churches completed in 1898
19th-century Christian Science church buildings
1898 establishments in Utah
National Register of Historic Places in Salt Lake City